The Seventh-day Adventist Church is a major Christian denomination with a significant presence in Cuba with a reported 38,303 members as of June 30, 2021. The Seventh-day Adventist Church splits Cuba into four Conferences from the main Union under the Inter-American Division.

Sub Fields
 Cuban Union Conference 
 Central Conference
 Del Amanecer Conference
 East Conference
 West Conference

Schools
The Seventh-day Adventist Church operates  a higher education institution called Cuba Adventist Seminary.

History
Seventh-day Adventists first started to work in Cuba after the Spanish–American War in 1898. They started organizing in 1904 with the first church a year later in La Lisa, near Havana. The Cuba Union Conference  was set up the next year and from six members in 1905, the Adventist Church grew to over 1,000 by the 1930s. Adventist elementary schools were started in 1922 all over the island, with a secondary school opened in San Claudio (Oriente province). The Adventist radio programs began in 1935 with the "La Voz de Atalaya" (The Voice of the Watchman) in Havana. Membership increased during this period and new schools and churches built and church offices located in Havana with local leaders and ministers. The Inter-American Division in Miami sent additional pastors as needed. After the 1959 Revolution all Adventist institutions such as schools and hospitals remained open, but were separated from the church and put under state control and secularized.

Many members meet in the outdoor for worship in some areas, and now look to see if they can begin to build new churches with the changes coming about.

Maranatha Volunteers
Maranatha volunteers have been renovating Seventh-day Adventist churches in Cuba since the 1990s. The projects are funded by donations and can take years to get completed. Maranatha has renovated hundreds of Cuban churches and assisted in building the Cuba Adventist Seminary(Seminario Teologico Adventista de Cuba) in Havana. Volunteers from the Maranatha project have renovated and built churches all over the Island, and have completed over 200 projects on the island.  with the most recent being the Seventh-day Adventist Church in San Antonio de los Baños, Cuba, and another project which had been waiting for over 20 years for the government to grant the permits for a church in Cárdenas, Cuba.

See also
Australian Union Conference of Seventh-day Adventists
Seventh-day Adventist Church in Brazil 
Seventh-day Adventist Church in Canada
Seventh-day Adventist Church in the People's Republic of China 
Seventh-day Adventist Church in Colombia 
Seventh-day Adventist Church in India 
Italian Union of Seventh-day Adventist Churches
Seventh-day Adventist Church in Ghana 
New Zealand Pacific Union Conference of Seventh-day Adventists
Seventh-day Adventist Church in Nigeria 
Adventism in Norway
Romanian Union Conference of Seventh-day Adventists
Seventh-day Adventist Church in Sweden 
Seventh-day Adventist Church in Thailand 
Seventh-day Adventist Church in Tonga
Seventh-day Adventists in Turks and Caicos Islands

References

Christian denominations in the Caribbean
Christian denominations in Cuba
History of the Seventh-day Adventist Church
Protestant denominations established in the 20th century
Cuba
Seventh-day Adventist Church in North America